Clint Eastwood has had numerous casual and serious relationships of varying length and intensity over his life, many of which overlapped. He has eight known children by six women, only half of whom were contemporaneously acknowledged. Eastwood refuses to confirm his exact number of offspring, and there have been wide discrepancies in the media regarding the number. His biographer, Patrick McGilligan, has stated on camera that Eastwood's total number of children is unclear and that "one was when he was still in high school."

Eastwood's first marriage was to manufacturing secretary Margaret Neville Johnson in December 1953, having met her on a blind date the previous May. During the courtship, he had an affair that resulted in his daughter, Laurie (born 1954), who was adopted by Clyde and Helen Warren of Seattle. While the identity of Laurie's biological mother is not public record, McGilligan said the mother belonged to a theatre group Eastwood participated in. Eastwood continued having affairs while married to Johnson, including a 1959 to 1973 liaison with stuntwoman Roxanne Tunis that produced a daughter, Kimber (born 1964).

Johnson tolerated the open marriage with Eastwood, and eventually they had two children, Kyle (born 1968) and Alison (born 1972). In 1975, Eastwood and married actress-director Sondra Locke began living together; she had been in a marriage of convenience since 1967 with Gordon Anderson, an unemployed homosexual. Locke claimed that Eastwood sang "She made me monogamous" to her and confided he had "never been in love before." Nine years into their cohabitation, Eastwood officially divorced Johnson; Locke, however, remained married to Anderson until her death in 2018.

In an unpublicized affair, Eastwood sired two legally fatherless children, Scott (born 1986) and Kathryn (born 1988) with Jacelyn Reeves, a flight attendant. When Locke and Eastwood separated in 1989, Locke filed a palimony lawsuit and later sued for fraud, reaching a settlement in both cases.

During the early-to-mid-1990s, Eastwood had a relationship with actress Frances Fisher that produced a daughter, Francesca (born 1993). Eastwood was married for the second time in 1996 to news anchor Dina Ruiz, who gave birth to their daughter Morgan that same year. Ruiz and Eastwood's marriage lasted until 2014. He has been seen with other women since then.

In a 2013 statement to People, Eastwood's longtime manager, Leonard Hirshan, professed to have no knowledge of his client's personal life.

Early sexual relationships 

During an interview for his sole authorized biography, Eastwood told film historian Richard Schickel that he lost his virginity to a neighbor when he was 14 years old. At age 19, Eastwood dated a schoolteacher in her 20s who stalked him and threatened to commit suicide after he broke up with her. Reflecting upon this relationship, Eastwood told US Weekly in 1987: "There was just a little misinterpretation about how serious the whole thing was."

Marriage to Margaret Johnson

First extramarital affairs and daughter placed for adoption 

In early 1953, Eastwood met Margaret Neville "Maggie" Johnson, a secretary for auto-parts suppliers Industria Americana, on a blind date in the San Francisco area. Johnson was scheduled to graduate from U.C. Berkeley that June. In the meantime, Eastwood left for Seattle, where "to please a girl he dug, he joined a Little Theatre group." According to Eastwood biographer Patrick McGilligan, the unnamed young woman became pregnant by Eastwood and placed their child, a girl, for adoption. Daughter Laurie Murray (born February 11, 1954) was widely covered in the media at the December 2018 premiere of Eastwood's film The Mule, the first time she was publicly identified as his daughter. Laurie was adopted by Clyde and Helen Warren of Seattle. According to her son Lowell Thomas Murray IV, Laurie's biological mother—whose identity is not publicly known—"never told Eastwood she was pregnant or spoke to him again.” On the contrary, McGilligan said that Eastwood discussed the woman's pregnancy with family and friends, then "handed money over to the woman and left for L.A."

Meanwhile, Johnson announced her engagement to Eastwood in October 1953. They married on December 19 in Pasadena, less than eight weeks before his Seattle girlfriend gave birth to Laurie.

Their marriage had problems. Schickel wrote, "He thought they were too young, not well enough established." Actress Mamie Van Doren later reported she had an affair with Eastwood while working on the film Star in the Dust in 1955. She starred and he played an uncredited bit role.

Relationship with Roxanne Tunis

In 1959 during the second season of Rawhide, Eastwood began a long-lasting affair (reportedly 14 years) with dancer and  stuntwoman Roxanne Tunis. She was also married yet separated. Their relationship resulted in Eastwood's earliest legal child, daughter Kimber Eastwood (born Kimber Tunis; June 17, 1964). Kimber's existence was kept secret from the public until July 1989, when the National Enquirer revealed her identity. Her birth certificate does list Eastwood as the father, however.

Biographer Marc Eliot wrote that Eastwood's wife Johnson may not have known about the baby at the time: "It is difficult to say for sure that she actually knew about the baby, although it would have been nearly impossible for her not to. Everyone on the set knew ... and it is simply too difficult to keep a secret like that when the mother and the illegitimate child live in the same small town, especially when that small town is Hollywood." The source for the 1989 Enquirer article that originally broke the story claimed Johnson was aware of Kimber's existence at all times and even met Roxanne Tunis in person when making an unannounced visit to the set of Breezy in 1972. Actress Barbara Eden, a onetime Rawhide guest star and witness to the affair with Tunis, said Eastwood and Johnson "...conducted a somewhat open marriage." Eastwood hinted as much in a 1971 interview, telling reporter Tim Chadwick: "We don't believe in togetherness."

In 1992, Johnson granted a rare interview with biographer Douglas Thompson, talking generally about her ex-husband and his career, but had "no comment" when asked about Tunis. Neither Tunis nor any of her nine siblings have ever spoken to the media. However, sources close to the Tunis family agreed to be interviewed anonymously for McGilligan's book in the late 1990s. According to them, "Clint wanted to have a baby with his mistress. [...] When she became pregnant, Clint was ecstatic." This directly contradicts the earlier Schickel biography of 1996, which spun the tale that Eastwood didn't even realize Tunis was pregnant until after Kimber had been born.

Other affairs and reconciliation 

Ria Brown, the biographer of competitive swimmer Anita Lhoest, claims Lhoest terminated a pregnancy by Eastwood without consulting him at one point during their late 1950s to early 1960s affair. Restaurant critic Gael Greene described an affair with Eastwood that started when she was assigned to interview him on the set of 1970's Two Mules for Sister Sara. A fling with French model Cathy Reghin around the same time was one of his few extramarital involvements to receive press coverage of any kind during the fact. Another French model, Danielle Cotet, claimed a two-year relationship with Eastwood and got a walk-on role in Paint Your Wagon, unbeknownst to the film's lead actress Jean Seberg, with whom Eastwood began an on-set affair that lasted about five months. According to McGilligan, Eastwood had many other affairs, including with co-stars Inger Stevens (Hang 'Em High) and Jo Ann Harris (The Beguiled), as well as actresses Jill Banner, Catherine Deneuve and Susan St. James, columnist Bridget Byrne, socialite Joan Lundberg Hitchcock and singer Keely Smith while married to Johnson, who, after a trial separation and a lingering bout of hepatitis during the mid-1960s, expressed desire to reconcile and start a family. They had two children together: Kyle Eastwood (born May 19, 1968) and Alison Eastwood (born May 22, 1972).

Relationship with Sondra Locke 

In 1972, Eastwood met married actress (later director) Sondra Locke at a meeting set up by mutual friend Jo Heims on the Universal Studios Lot. Her lifestyle was congruent to his, as she had married for societal purposes while conducting a succession of affairs that were withheld from public view. The two began living together during the production of The Outlaw Josey Wales in Page, Arizona, in October 1975, by which time, according to Locke, "He had told me that there was no real relationship left between him and Maggie." Locke wrote in her autobiography, "Clint seemed astonished at his need for me, even admitting that he'd never been faithful to one woman — because he'd "never been in love before," he confided. He even made up a song about it: 'She made me monogamous'. That flattered and delighted me. I would never doubt his faithfulness and his love for me."

After Josey wrapped, Locke moved into the Sherman Oaks house Eastwood had once shared with Johnson (who by then lived full-time in Pebble Beach), but felt uncomfortable there because "psychologically, it would always be Maggie's." "Finally I told Clint that I couldn't live there any longer," wrote Locke. The couple moved to Bel-Air in a fixer-upper that took three years to renovate. In the interim they shuttled between homes in Tiburon, California and Sun Valley, Idaho, as well as the Rising River Ranch which Eastwood bought from Bing Crosby's estate. Locke had two abortions and then a tubal ligation during the late 1970s. She was quite reluctant to have the second abortion. She later said, "I couldn't help but think that that baby, with both Clint's and my best qualities, would be extraordinary.". Johnson made no secret of her dislike for Locke, even though the two women never met. "Maggie placed severe rules on my relationship with the kids. Apparently, she never forgave me. [...] After she learned that Clint had taken me onto her property to show me a baby deer that had just been born there, she laid down a rule that I was never to be allowed there again. I was not even allowed to phone the Pebble Beach house."

Divorce from Johnson 

In late 1978, Johnson hired an attorney to file for legal separation from Eastwood. Earlier that year she had finally accepted the fact that Locke "was not like any of his affairs of their past." Divorce papers, however, would not be filed until May 18, 1984. The divorce was finalized on November 19, with Johnson receiving a straight cash payment reported to be between $25 and $30 million.

For her part, Locke never divorced Gordon Anderson, her lawful husband since 1967. Anderson, a sculptor and former stage actor, was gay and resided with his partner in a West Hollywood home purchased by Eastwood. The Locke/Anderson union had always been a marriage of convenience only and was never consummated, according to court testimony. Locke said of the unorthodox arrangement: "I truly believed that Clint and I did not need papers to validate the commitments we had made to each other."

Eastwood and Locke reteamed onscreen for The Gauntlet, Every Which Way but Loose, Bronco Billy, Any Which Way You Can and Sudden Impact. According to former longtime associate Fritz Manes, Eastwood was devoted to her between 1976 and 1980 at the least, but discreetly kept up several "maintenance relationships" (such as with Tunis) during that period. "I marveled at it. It was absolute total, blind love," Manes said. According to Schickel, the relationship began to disintegrate when Locke chose to remain married to Anderson after Eastwood had divorced Johnson. Locke said she would've been willing to divorce Anderson if Eastwood agreed to go to couples therapy with her, but he refused.

Affairs with Jacelyn Reeves and others

McGilligan claims Eastwood returned to his "habitual womanizing" in the early 1980s, becoming involved with story analyst Megan Rose, actress Jamie Rose (who played a bit part in Tightrope), animal rights activist Jane Brolin (who had intermittent liaisons with Eastwood between the early 1960s and late 1980s), and stewardess Jacelyn Reeves.

Children with Reeves  

Eastwood was still cohabiting with Locke when he conceived two children with Reeves: son Scott Eastwood (born Scott Reeves; March 21, 1986) and daughter Kathryn Eastwood (born Kathryn Reeves; February 2, 1988).  The birth certificates for both children read "father declined." Eastwood's affair with Reeves was not reported anywhere until an exposé article was published in the Star tabloid in 1990. Reeves reportedly stated, "Some family members tell me to file a paternity suit against Clint, but I don't want to." The children's existence continued to be ignored by mainstream news sources through the mid-2000s.

Breakup with Locke 

Eastwood's relationship with Locke (at the time, unaware of his infidelities) ended acrimoniously in April 1989, and the post-breakup litigation dragged on for a decade. Locke filed a palimony lawsuit against him after he changed the locks on their home and moved her possessions into storage when she was at work filming her second directorial feature, Impulse. In court, Eastwood downplayed the intensity of their relationship. He described Locke as a "roommate" before quickly redescribing her as a "part-time roommate." Bill Brown, publisher of the Carmel Pine Cone newspaper and a golfing pal of Eastwood's, said despite the public animosity, "Clint told me not too long ago that Sondra was the love of his life." Locke's estranged half-brother Donald told The Tennessean that Eastwood still truly loved her, but could no longer take her "addiction" to husband Gordon Anderson.

Anticipating that Eastwood was going to misrepresent the marriage, Locke asked Anderson to surrender all claims on any of her assets that as her legal spouse he was entitled to. "In an extraordinary gesture of love and faith in me, Gordon signed away everything without hesitation." During the proceedings, an investigative journalist contacted Locke and informed her of Eastwood's other family. "I spoke with the nurse in the delivery room, and she confirmed that they are Clint's children. I'll send copies of the birth certificates to you and a photo of Jacelyn, if you want them," Locke quoted the informant. "My mind was still searching to get all his actions lined up. For at least the last four years, Clint had been living this double life, going between me and this other woman, and having children with her. Two babies had been born during the last three years of our relationship, and they weren't mine."

As the case progressed, Locke developed breast cancer and said the treatments sapped her will to fight. She dropped her suit in November 1990 in exchange for a settlement package that included a lump sum plus monthly payments from Eastwood and a $1.5 million directing deal at Warner Bros., but sued him again for fraud in 1995 when she became convinced the deal was a sham, finally settling out of court in September 1996.

Eastwood was listed as a material witness for Locke's separate pending action against Warner Bros., which alleged that the studio conspired with him to sabotage her directorial career, but in May 1999 that lawsuit too was settled, ending the legal saga. Over the following years, Locke made discrediting comments about Eastwood. She died in 2018, aged 74. At the time of her death, Locke had been legally married to Anderson for 51 years, leaving an estate worth $20 million.

Casual dating 

Immediately following his split from Locke, Eastwood dated Barbra Streisand. Other  female companions during 1989 included White Hunter, Black Heart co-star Marisa Berenson, Carmel mayor Jean Grace, actress Dani Crayne and model Barbara Minty, widow of Steve McQueen.

Daughter with Frances Fisher 

Eastwood's next major relationship was with Frances Fisher, an actress he had met on the set of Pink Cadillac in October 1988. The two quietly enjoyed a non-exclusive, intermittent affair for two years before going public with their romance in late 1990. Fisher retrospectively said of dating Eastwood: "I simply felt that this was it, the big one. I had no idea that every woman he meets probably feels as I did." They co-starred in Unforgiven, and had a daughter, Francesca Eastwood (born Francesca Fisher-Eastwood; August 7, 1993), on the anniversary of that film's release. The birth of Francesca marked the first time Eastwood was present for one of his children's birth. Nevertheless, he made Fisher keep her pregnancy a secret until her last trimester, reasoning, "I don't want that kinda thing taking attention away from my Oscar race!"

Despite being legally free to wed, the couple did not marry. About a month before their daughter was born, according to McGilligan, Eastwood was confronted with the claims of a 39-year-old woman from Kent, Washington who had researched her adoption and ascertained that he was her biological father. Eastwood has never responded to the story. Another strain on the relationship came when Fisher found out—not through him—about yet another secret brood with Jacelyn Reeves. Eastwood and Fisher ended their relationship in January 1995.

In 2018, Francesca gave birth to a son named Titan Wraith. While Eastwood is a grandfather several times over, Titan is his first grandchild whose birth was announced.

Marriage and divorce with Dina Ruiz

Before Fisher had moved out of Eastwood's home, he was reportedly already dating Dina Ruiz, a television news anchor 35 years his junior whom he first met when she interviewed him in April 1993. It is not clear when exactly the two started seeing each other romantically. Eastwood took Ruiz to two high-profile golf tournaments in February 1995 without ever announcing that he and Fisher had broken up. Ruiz announced her engagement to Eastwood in January 1996. 
They married on March 31, when Eastwood surprised her with a private ceremony at a home on the Shadow Creek Golf Course in Las Vegas. The marriage was noted for the fact that it was only Eastwood's second legal union in spite of his many long-term romances over the decades. Eastwood said of his bride, "I'm proud to make this lady my wife. She's the one I've been waiting for." Ruiz commented, "The fact that I'm only the second woman he has married really touches me." The couple has one daughter, Morgan Eastwood (born December 12, 1996).

Ruiz made cameos in two of Eastwood's films: Blood Work and True Crime (in which Fisher even appeared). In the summer of 2012, Dina, Morgan and Francesca starred with the band Overtone in a reality show for the E! network titled Mrs. Eastwood & Company, on which Clint appeared only occasionally. Also featured in the series was Dina's sister-in-law Jade Berti, granddaughter of comedy legend Groucho Marx. (By sheer coincidence, Marx's handprint square at Grauman's Chinese Theatre touches corners with Mr. Eastwood's; Berti viewed this as a sign of her relationship with Dina's brother, special effects coordinator Dominic Ruiz, being written "in stone and in the stars.") While promoting the show on Chelsea Lately, Dina said jokingly: "I hope we're still married when this is over!" – a reference to the apparent trend that many marriages on reality TV end in divorce.

On August 28, 2013, Dina Eastwood announced that she and her husband had been living separately for an undisclosed length of time. By fall, Eastwood's wife filed for divorce after she withdrew her request for legal separation, citing irreconcilable differences. She asked for full custody of their then 16-year-old daughter, Morgan, as well as spousal support. The divorce was finalized on December 22, 2014.

Later relationships 

Since his split from Ruiz, Eastwood has been linked publicly with photographer Erica Tomlinson-Fisher (no relation to Frances), 41 years his junior, and restaurant hostess Christina Sandera, 33 years his junior. He and Sandera went public with their relationship at the 87th Academy Awards in February 2015.

Further alleged offspring 

Laurie Murray, Kimber Tunis, and Scott and Kathryn Reeves are omitted from the Eastwood episode of A&E's Biography series, which first aired on October 5, 2003. The UK edition of Clint: The Life and Legend (1999) was the first publication to report Laurie's existence, although her name was not revealed, and she was not acknowledged by any media outlet until 2018.

Some sources, including a now-defunct website launched in 2006 by his cousin Steve, cite another child named Lesly (born February 13, 1959) by Rosina Mary Glen.

Publicly, Eastwood has been silent on claims of other offspring. "We don't know how many children Clint has had with how many women," McGilligan stated on-camera in the 2012 French documentary L'album secret de Clint Eastwood. "One was when he was still in high school. [...] I heard of other possibilities." Playboy notes that "the number is unconfirmed and Eastwood is reticent about the issue."

When Steve Kroft asked Eastwood how many children he has in a 1997 60 Minutes interview, he replied, without further elaboration, "I have a few."

Footnotes

References

Bibliography 

 
 
 

Clint Eastwood
Eastwood, Clint